Ravna Gora is a village in the municipality of Vlasotince, Serbia. According to the 2002 census, the village has a population of 151 people.

References

Populated places in Jablanica District